Hall Station may refer to:
Hall Station, Colorado
Hall Station, West Virginia

See also
City Hall Station (disambiguation)